Turkmenistan is divided into five regions or welaýatlar (singular welaýat) and one capital city (şäher) with provincial legal status. They are Ahal, Balkan, Dashoguz, Lebap and Mary, plus the capital city of Ashgabat. Each province is divided into districts. As of 20 December 2022 there were 37 districts, 49 cities, including 7 cities with district status, 68 towns, 469 rural councils (rural municipal units) and 1690 villages (rural settlements ) in Turkmenistan.

Capital city 

The capital city of Turkmenistan is Ashgabat, which is an administrative and territorial unit with provincial authorities. 
See also Map of the Boroughs of Ashgabat

As of January 5, 2018, Ashgabat includes four boroughs (uly etraplar), each with a presidentially appointed mayor:

 Bagtyýarlyk etraby (formerly President Niyazov, Lenin District, expanded to include former Ruhabat District plus new territory)
 Berkararlyk etraby (formerly Azatlyk, Sovetskiy District)
 Büzmeýin etraby (formerly Abadan District, expanded to include former Arçabil and Çandybil Districts)
 Köpetdag etraby (formerly Proletarskiy District)

This is a reduction from the previous number of boroughs.  Arçabil and Çandybil boroughs were merged on February 4, 2015, and the new etrap, named Arçabil, was in turn renamed Büzmeýin in January 2018.  At that time the Abadan borough of Ashgabat, created in 2013 by annexing the town of Abadan and surrounding villages to Abadan's south, was abolished and its territory was merged into the newly renamed Büzmeýin borough.  The former Ruhabat borough was abolished at the same time and its territory absorbed by Bagtyýarlyk borough.

On 15 June 2020, Turkmen President Gurbanguly Berdimuhamedow announced intention to create a fifth borough of Ashgabat, to be called Altyn etraby, centered on the new resort zone created on the shores of the former Gurtly Water Reservoir, recently renamed "Golden Lake" (Altyn köl).

List of regions 

The heads of the regions ("the leader"), sometimes known as "governors", are appointed by the President of Turkmenistan (Constitution of Turkmenistan, Articles 80–81).

See also
Districts of Turkmenistan
ISO 3166-2:TM

References

 
Subdivisions of Turkmenistan
Turkmenistan 1
Turkmenistan 1
Regions, Turkmenistan
Turkmenistan geography-related lists